The Irbit is a river in Sverdlovsk Oblast, Russia in the Tura River basin. It is a tributary of the Nitsa. It has its sources near the town of Sukhoy Log, which is on the Pyshma River and flows in a northeasterly direction between the Pyshma and Nitsa towards its mouth in the Nitsa at the town of Irbit.

Rivers of Sverdlovsk Oblast